Úvaly is a town in Prague-East District in the Central Bohemian Region of the Czech Republic. It has about 7,000 inhabitants.

Geography
It lies in the Prague Plateau on the Výmola stream. There are several small fish ponds in the municipal territory.

History
The first written mention of Úvaly is from 1290. The settlement lied on the important trade route Prague–Český Brod–Kutná Hora, which helped to its growth. In 1654 it was first mentioned as a market town. In 1845, the railroad Prague–Olomouc, which goes through Úvaly, was built, and its population grew up from hundreds to thousands. In 1969, Úvaly became a town.

Demographics

Sights

The main landmark is the Church of the Annunciation of the Virgin Mary. It was built on the site of a chapel founded in 1342.

Notable people
Marie Majerová (1882–1967), writer, translator, journalist
Vladimír Kejř (1929–1981), gymnast
Oldřich Hamera (1944–2021), graphic artist

References

External links

Information portal
Places and stories in Úvaly and surroundings

Cities and towns in the Czech Republic
Populated places in Prague-East District